Tim Bauer (born January 16, 1985) is a German former professional footballer who played as a defender.

References

External links
 
 

Living people
1985 births
Association football defenders
German footballers
Germany youth international footballers
3. Liga players
SV Werder Bremen players
TSG 1899 Hoffenheim II players
TSG 1899 Hoffenheim players
Sportfreunde Siegen players
SV Sandhausen players
VfR Aalen players
Wormatia Worms players
Footballers from Mannheim